William Albert Patterson (July 10, 1841 – June 14, 1917) was a Canadian politician, who represented the electoral district of Colchester in the House of Commons of Canada from 1891 to 1896 as a member of the Conservative Party.

He was born in Pictou, Nova Scotia, the son of Abram Patterson and Christiana McGregor. He was a lumber merchant. In 1869, he married Bessie Campbell. Patterson represented Colchester County in the Nova Scotia House of Assembly from 1874 to 1886 as a Liberal-Conservative member. He was defeated when he ran for reelection in 1886. Patterson also served as a captain in the militia.

References
 
The Canadian parliamentary companion, 1891, JA Gemmill

1841 births
1917 deaths
Conservative Party of Canada (1867–1942) MPs
Members of the House of Commons of Canada from Nova Scotia
People from Colchester County
People from Pictou County
Progressive Conservative Association of Nova Scotia MLAs